The Bonsor Baronetcy, of Kingswood, in the parish of Epsom, in the County of Surrey, is a title in the Baronetage of the United Kingdom. It was created on 26 January 1925 for Cosmo Bonsor, Chairman of the South Eastern Railway, Conservative Member of Parliament for Wimbledon and a Director of the Bank of England. As of 2010 the title is held by his great-grandson, the fourth Baronet, who succeeded his father in 1977. He has previously represented Nantwich and Upminster in the House of Commons as a Conservative.

The family seat is Liscombe Park, Soulbury, Buckinghamshire.  It is an Elizabethan manor hall.

Bonsor baronets, of Kingswood (1925)

Sir (Henry) Cosmo Orme Bonsor, 1st Baronet (1848–1929)
Sir Reginald Bonsor, 2nd Baronet (1879–1959)
Sir Bryan Cosmo Bonsor, MC, 3rd Baronet (1916–1977)
Sir Nicholas Cosmo Bonsor, 4th Baronet (born 1942)

The heir apparent is the present holder's son Alexander Cosmo Walrond Bonsor (born 1976). He became engaged in November 2005 to Jane Troughton, marrying the following year.

Notes

References 
Kidd, Charles, Williamson, David (editors). Debrett's Peerage and Baronetage (1990 edition). New York: St Martin's Press, 1990, 

Bonsor